The 1953 Philadelphia Athletics season involved the A's finishing seventh in the American League with a record of 59 wins and 95 losses, 41½ games behind the New York Yankees, who would win their fifth consecutive World Series Championship.  It was also the penultimate season for the franchise in Philadelphia.

Offseason 
 January 27, 1953: Ferris Fain and Bob Wilson (minors) were traded by the Athletics to the Chicago White Sox for Joe DeMaestri, Ed McGhee and Eddie Robinson.
 February 2, 1953: Sam Zoldak was released by the Athletics.

Regular season 
During the season, Bob Trice became the first black player in the history of the Athletics.

Season standings

Record vs. opponents

Roster

Player stats

Batting

Starters by position 
Note: Pos = Position; G = Games played; AB = At bats; H = Hits; Avg. = Batting average; HR = Home runs; RBI = Runs batted in

Other batters 
Note: G = Games played; AB = At bats; H = Hits; Avg. = Batting average; HR = Home runs; RBI = Runs batted in

Pitching

Starting pitchers 
Note: G = Games pitched; IP = Innings pitched; W = Wins; L = Losses; ERA = Earned run average; SO = Strikeouts

Other pitchers 
Note: G = Games pitched; IP = Innings pitched; W = Wins; L = Losses; ERA = Earned run average; SO = Strikeouts

Relief pitchers 
Note: G = Games pitched; W = Wins; L = Losses; SV = Saves; ERA = Earned run average; SO = Strikeouts

Farm system 

LEAGUE CHAMPIONS: Savannah, Welch

References

External links
1953 Philadelphia Athletics at Baseball Reference
1953 Philadelphia Athletics at Baseball Almanac

Oakland Athletics seasons
Philadelphia Athletics season
Oak